The Lancashire Amateur Football League is an English association football league founded in 1899.  Currently the league consists of six divisions – Premier, One, Two, Three, Four and Five. The Premier Division is at level 14 in the English football league system.

The top two teams from each division are promoted to the next division up and the bottom two teams are relegated to the next division down. Two teams from the same club are not permitted to compete in the same division.

The Lancashire Amateur Football League (more commonly known as the LAL) was founded in 1899. Clubs are situated throughout the old boundaries of Lancashire and Cheshire; stretching from Preston in the north, Southport in the west, Rochdale and Oldham in the east and Lymm in the south.

The Executive Committee and League Council are elected by clubs in membership of the League. Although clubs running a minimum of two teams are preferred, the League will consider applications for clubs running one team provided they match the League's standards expected for discipline, ground and facilities, fair play and standards of organisation/administration. The League has a strict policy of monitoring the discipline record of players (using a points system) and players whose conduct has not been considered acceptable are subject to their registration being withdrawn.

Member club Old Boltonians play on what has been recognised as the oldest football ground still in use in the world.

References

External links
Official league website
LAL "Full-time" website

Football leagues in England
Football in Lancashire
Sports leagues established in 1899
1899 establishments in England